Hugh Francis Maguire (July 1, 1887 – February 1967) was an American long-distance runner. He competed in the men's 10,000 metres at the 1912 Summer Olympics.

References

1887 births
1967 deaths
Athletes (track and field) at the 1912 Summer Olympics
American male long-distance runners
Olympic track and field athletes of the United States
Place of birth missing
20th-century American people